Carl Timoleon von Neff, also Timofey Andreyevich Neff (– ) was a Russian Imperial artist of Baltic German descent.

Biography
Carl Timoleon von Neff was born at a manor house in Neu-Isenhof (Püssi), Kreis Wierland in the Governorate of Estonia of the Russian Empire (present-day Estonia) in 1804. His mother was a French governess at the estate; he was an illegitimate child. He began studying art in Estonia under the tutelage of Karl von Kügelgen and continued at the Academy of Arts in Dresden, present-day Germany. He graduated from there in 1825. Following his graduation, he travelled and divided his time between his native Estonia, Italy and Saint Petersburg, the Imperial capital. In St. Petersburg he received a commission to paint the daughters of the emperor Nicholas I.

The portrait was apparently well received as he from this time onward became tied to the court, and made a career as an artist working for the higher echelons of society. He received prestigious commissions in both St. Petersburg and abroad. In recognition for his work, especially for contributing to the artistic embellishment of several churches, he was generously awarded with different forms of official recognition, such as orders and titles. In addition, he became one of the emperor's closest advisers in questions related to art. In 1846, he was made an honorary member of the Academy of Florence and after finishing the decoration of parts of the iconostasis of St. Isaac's Cathedral in St. Petersburg, was nominated to become a member of the Russian Imperial Academy of Arts. Following his many successes he built an Italianate manor house to house his personal art collection in Muuga, Estonia.

Works
As a court artist, von Neff was appreciated as a portraitist and painter of typically academical subjects which were then popular, notably odalisque-like nude bathers and nymphs. As mentioned, he contributed to the artistic decoration of Saint Isaac's Cathedral, St. Petersburg, Cathedral of Christ the Saviour, Moscow, and Helsinki Cathedral, in present-day Finland, as well as churches outside the Russian empire - e.g. in Nice, France and Wiesbaden, present-day Germany. Several of his works are displayed in the Art Museum of Estonia today.

Gallery

See also
Culture of Estonia
 List of Baltic German artists

References

External links

Works by von Neff at the Art Museum of Estonia

1804 births
1877 deaths
People from Püssi
People from Kreis Wierland
Baltic-German people
Estonian people of French descent
19th-century Estonian painters
19th-century Estonian male artists
19th-century painters from the Russian Empire
Russian male painters
19th-century male artists from the Russian Empire
Privy Councillor (Russian Empire)